Neolamprologus helianthus is a species of cichlid endemic to Lake Tanganyika where it is usually found in shallow, rocky habitats. It never strays far from the rocky substrate. Adults do not appear to form schools. The fish is omnivorous.    This species can reach a length of  TL.  This species can also be found in the aquarium trade.

References

Büscher, H.H., 1997. Ein neuer Cichlide aus dem Tanganjikasee: Neolamprologus helianthus (Cichlidae, Lamprologini). Datz 50(11):701–706.

helianthus
Taxa named by Heinz Heinrich Büscher
Fish described in 1997
Fish of Lake Tanganyika